Trigger may refer to:

Notable animals and people
Mononym
 Trigger (horse), owned by cowboy star Roy Rogers
Nickname
 Trigger Alpert (1916–2013), American jazz bassist
 "Trigger Mike" Coppola (1900–1966), American gangster
Surname
 Bruce Trigger (1937–2006), Canadian archaeologist
 Damon Trigger (born 1972), New Zealand born former English cricketer
 Hannah Trigger (born 1987), Australian snowboarder
 Ian Trigger (1938–2010), British actor

Technology
 Trigger (firearms), a mechanism that actuates the firing of firearms
 Database trigger, procedural code that is automatically executed in response to certain events
 Dead man's trigger, a safety device that activates safeguards if the operator is incapacitated
 Flip-flop (electronics), called a trigger circuit by IBM 
 Image trigger, a device used in high speed cameras
 Schmitt trigger, an electronic circuit

Art, entertainment, and media

Fictional entities
 Trigger (Only Fools and Horses), a BBC sitcom character played by Roger Lloyd-Pack
 Trigger Argee, a fictional character in a series of science fiction short stories by James H. Schmitz 
 Devil Trigger, a transformation ability found in the Devil May Cry series
 Trigger, a fictional horse in "Ernie (The Fastest Milkman in the West)"
 The main player character in Ace Combat 7: Skies Unknown
 Trigger, the version of Popeye in the film The Story of Temple Drake (1933), a film adaptation of the William Faulkner novel Sanctuary

Film and television
 Trigger (2010 film), a Canadian film
 Trigger, Jr. (1950), a 1950 American film starring Roy Rogers
 "Triggers" (Supergirl), an episode of Supergirl
 Ultraman Trigger, a 2021 Japanese tokusatsu television series
 Trigger (2022 film), a Tamil-language film

Literature
 The Trigger, a 1999 science fiction novel by Arthur C. Clarke and Michael P. Kube-McDowell
 Triggers (novel), a 2012 science fiction novel by Robert J. Sawyer

Music
 The Trigger (band), a Serbian hard rock/heavy metal band

Albums and EPs
 Trigger (EP), a 2003 EP by In Flames
 Trigger (album), a 2010 album by Porno Graffitti
 Trigger, an album by Jacob Quistgaard
 Trigger, an album by Soulside
 Trigger, an album by The Law

Instruments
 Trigger (drums), a transducer that allows a drum to control an electronic device
 Trigger (guitar), the Martin N-20 guitar played by Willie Nelson
 Trigger (trombone), a switch that enables a trombonist to switch from one set of tubing to another
 Trigger pad, a device used in electronic percussion

Songs
 "Trigger" (song), a 2019 song by Major Lazer and Khalid
 "Trigger", by Anne-Marie from Speak Your Mind
 "Trigger", by Converge from The Dusk in Us
 "Trigger", by In Flames from Reroute to Remain and its eponymous EP

Ships
 USS Trigger (SS-237), a submarine (laid down 1941, sunk 1945)
 USS Trigger (SS-564), a submarine (laid down 1949, decommissioned 1973)

Science
 Trigger (particle physics), hardware or software based device for the (online-)selection of specific event classes from large datasets
 Trigger, one event that makes a slope failure in landslides, in the causes of landslides
 Environmental trigger, a factor caused (or aided) by the environment
 ATLAS trigger system, in the ATLAS experiment

Biology
 Hibernation induction trigger, a blood substance that induces hibernation
 Seizure trigger, a factor that can cause a seizure
 Spawning triggers, environmental cues that cause fish to breed

Other uses
 Studio Trigger, a Japanese animation studio founded by Hiroyuki Imaishi
 Trigger, a verb conjugation specifying the subject's role in languages with Austronesian alignment
 Casus belli, an event triggering a war
 Trauma trigger, an event causing traumatic memories or feelings to resurface
 Trigger (game controller), a button on some game controllers

See also
 
 
 Triggered (disambiguation)
 Trigger warning (disambiguation)